Rattner is a surname. Notable people with the surname include:

Abraham Rattner (1895–1978), American artist
Brett Rattner (born 1969), American film director and producer
Justin Rattner, American Businesspeople and retired Intel Senior Fellow, Corporate Vice President and former director of Intel Labs
Steven Rattner (born 1952), American investment manager
Steven C. Rattner (born 1960), American Managing Director of Credit Suisse

See also 
Leepa-Rattner Museum of Art
Ratner